Mandy Jones is a Welsh politician who was a Member of the Senedd (MS) for North Wales from 2017 to 2021. Jones was elected for the UK Independence Party (UKIP) but sat as an independent politician within the Senedd from early January 2018 until May 2019, when she joined the Brexit Party (Reform UK). In October 2020 she joined the Independent Alliance for Reform group.

Background
Jones was born in Wolverhampton, West Midlands and worked as a farm contractor and shepherd in north east Wales. She studied Agriculture & Small Animal Care at Llysfasi College. She brought up her family in the Corwen area.

Political career
Jones stood for UKIP in the Clwyd South constituency at the 2015 General Election. She also stood for UKIP in Clwyd South at the 2016 Welsh Assembly election, coming fourth behind Labour, the Conservatives and Plaid Cymru. As the third UKIP candidate on the North Wales regional party list, she failed to secure a National Assembly for Wales seat.

Following the resignation in December 2017 of former UKIP Assembly Member (AM), Nathan Gill, Jones (as the next available UKIP candidate on the regional list) was confirmed on 27 December as the replacement AM. She was due to actively take up her duties following an oath swearing ceremony, which took place on 29 December at the Welsh Assembly's Colwyn Bay buildings.

On 9 January 2018, UKIP Wales announced that she would not be joining the UKIP group in the Assembly, due to employing members of other parties in her office. Jones refused to change her staff and described the UKIP group as "toxic". She describes herself as a Faragist and claims former UKIP leader Nigel Farage supports her actions. Her party membership was suspended on 18 June 2018 following criticism of Neil Hamilton's nomination as an assembly commissioner.

In March 2019, Jones spoke in the Assembly Chamber about the physical and emotional abuse she suffered from her adopted mother, in opposition to the Welsh Government's proposals to ban the smacking of children.

In May 2019, Jones along with three other Assembly Members joined the Brexit Party and formed an assembly group in the Senedd, led by Mark Reckless.

In mid October 2020 she formed a new group in the Senedd, the Independent Alliance for Reform, together with fellow MSs David Rowlands and Caroline Jones.

In the 2021 Senedd election, Jones contested Clwyd South for Reform UK. 
She was unsuccessful in getting elected, and did not stand as a candidate for the North Wales Region.

Electoral history

2015 general election

2016 Assembly election

Constituency

Regional list 
Jones was placed third on the North Wales regional list for the UK Independence Party, behind Nathan Gill and Michelle Brown.

References

External links 

 Official webpage 
Mandy Jones on Twitter

Living people
Year of birth missing (living people)
UK Independence Party members of the Senedd
Reform UK members of the Senedd
Female members of the Senedd
Wales MSs 2016–2021
Politicians from Denbighshire
People from Wolverhampton
UK Independence Party parliamentary candidates
Welsh farmers
Welsh politicians